Armbro Flight (1962-1995) was a champion trotting mare bred by the Armstrong Brothers Farm of J. Elgin, Ted and Charles Armstrong in Brampton, Ontario, Canada. She established five world records in the 1960s. She was honored by Canada Post in 1999 with the issuance of a commemorative postage stamp along with Northern Dancer. One of North America's greatest trotting mares of the 1960s, Armbro Flight was inducted into the Canadian Horse Racing Hall of Fame in 1976 and into the United States Racing Hall of Fame in 1998.

References

1962 racehorse births
1995 racehorse deaths
Racehorses bred in Canada
Canadian Champion racehorses
Canadian Standardbred racehorses
Canadian Horse Racing Hall of Fame inductees
United States Harness Racing Hall of Fame inductees